Cheek Creek Township, population 628, is one of eleven townships in Montgomery County, North Carolina, United States.

Geography
Cheek Creek Township is drained entirely by the Little River and its tributaries.  The Little River is part of the larger Pee Dee River watershed.  The northeast part of the township has a small area of the Uwharrie Mountains and the southern part has the wide floodplain of Cheek Creek.

References

Townships in Montgomery County, North Carolina
Townships in North Carolina